Évert Erickson Wilmer Lengua Vergara (born 20 January 1983) is a Peruvian footballer who plays as a centre back. He currently plays for Cobresol in the Torneo Descentralizado.

Club career
Lengua played for Estudiantes de Medicina in the 2002 Torneo Descentralizado season. He played in Peruvian top-flight for the Ica based side until the end of the 2004 season.

Then he joined Universidad César Vallejo in 2007. Then in 2008 he had a short spell with Segunda División side La Peña Sporting and later Copa Perú side Sport Huamanga.

Then in January 2009 he joined Cobresol.

References

1983 births
Living people
People from Pisco, Peru
Peruvian footballers
Estudiantes de Medicina footballers
Club Deportivo Universidad César Vallejo footballers
Cobresol FBC footballers
Peruvian Primera División players
Association football central defenders